In mathematics, pseudoanalytic functions are functions introduced by  that generalize analytic functions and satisfy a weakened form of the Cauchy–Riemann equations.

Definitions 
Let  and let  be a real-valued function defined in a bounded domain .

If  is pseudoanalytic at every point in some domain, then it is pseudoanalytic in that domain.

Similarities to analytic functions 

Examples 
 Complex constants are pseudoanalytic.
 Any linear combination with real coefficients of pseudoanalytic functions is pseudoanalytic.

See also 

 Quasiconformal mapping
 Elliptic partial differential equations
 Cauchy-Riemann equations

References

Further reading 

 
 
 

Complex analysis
Partial differential equations
Types of functions